Owl's crown is a common name for several plants and may refer to:

Gamochaeta sphacelata, native to South America, Central America, and Mexico
Gnaphalium sylvaticum, native to Europe